Lothar Dräger (January 19, 1927 – July 9, 2016) was a German comic writer.

Writings 
 Mosaik (Digedags) by Hannes Hegen, Co-author from 1957 to 1975
 Mosaik (Abrafaxe), author and artistic director from 1976 to 1990.
 Lothar Dräger, Ulf S. Graupner: Ritter Runkel und seine Zeit. Berlin 2002. (novel)
 Lothar Dräger, Ulf S. Graupner: Ritter Runkel der Diplomat. Berlin 2006. (novel)
 Lothar Dräger, Ulf S. Graupner: Ritter Runkel die Legende. Berlin 2009. (novel)
 Lothar Dräger, Ulf S. Graupner: Im Namen der Rübe. Berlin 2012. (novel)

Literature 
 Thomas Kramer: Micky, Marx und Manitu – Zeit-und Kulturgeschichte im Spiegel eines DDR-Comics 1955–1990. Berlin 2002.
 Matthias Friske: Die Geschichte des 'MOSAIK von Hannes Hegen'. Eine Comic-Legende in der DDR, Berlin 2008.
 Mark Lehmstedt: Die geheime Geschichte der Digedags. Die Publikations- und Zensurgeschichte des Mosaik von Hannes Hegen, Leipzig 2010, Lehmstedt Verlag.

External links 
 
 

1927 births
2016 deaths
German comics writers
People from Vorpommern-Greifswald
People from the Province of Pomerania
German male writers